Pedestrian tunnel may refer to:
 A subway (underpass)
 An underground city